Christina Fernandez (born 1965) is an American photographer. She is an associate professor and co-chair of the photography department at Cerritos College.

Biography
Fernandez earned a Bachelor of Arts from the University of California, Los Angeles in 1989 and an MFA from California Institute of the Arts in 1996.

Based in Los Angeles, her works deal with social and political commentary. Social consciousness and her Mexican heritage often influence her photography and collages, along with themes of space, migration, immigration, labor, gender, and her own relationship to the city of Los Angeles.

Fernandez has received many awards and fellowships, including a Fellowship for Visual Arts in 2011 from the California Community Foundation.

Her photographs are held in numerous museum collections including the Smithsonian American Art Museum. Since 2007, Fernandez's work has frequently been featured in exhibits at Gallery Luisotti in Santa Monica.

Christina’s work examines the intersections between private and public space, personal and historical narratives, ex-urban and city spaces and the cultural border and historical relationships between the United States and Mexico.

Some of her work depicting mythical and historical figures are part of the oeuvre of her early works (Maria’s Great Expedition (1995 -1996) and the Ruin (1999 – 2000) series).

Selected works

María's Great Expedition (1995–96) 
María's Great Expedition (1995–96) is a reenactment of Fernandez own family history interwoven with America's history.  Through six photographs of staged scenes and a map, Fernandez reimagines the story of her great-grandmother, a single mother who migrated from Mexico to Southern California. The scenes reference stories about the formidable challenges of starting anew in an unfamiliar place. By employing various costumes and printing techniques, Fernandez signals the passage of time. She also provides intimate narratives that offer insight into the circumstances of that time and challenge stereotypes about immigrants.

Sereno (2006) 
The Sereno series (2006) was shot in El Sereno, in northeast Los Angeles, a working-class Mexican and Mexican American neighborhood. It describes Fernandez’s role as a participant in the gentrification of the area since the 2008 housing bubble burst. Fernandez conveys a sense of homelessness, of something lost, missing, or unattainable through the images by photographing in-between spaces where the refuse of outdated household items was dumped and people who could not afford even this modest community were forced to live outside. Sereno is absent of human figures and describes human presence through things left behind. By foregrounding the refuse against the backdrop of neighborhood homes, Sereno asks, “Who is this place for? Who has access? Who does not?”

Lavanderia (2002) 
Lavanderia depicts a series of laundromat windows in the Boyle Heights neighborhood of Los Angeles. Fernandez says of the project: “The window is a membrane, because the outside and the inside are delineated by that graffiti. The paint etched into the glass, and was drippy at the same time, so it had the appearance of visual violence in a way, but it’s also very beautiful.” She adds: “I became interested in the aesthetic because I was living in Boyle Heights in the mid-1990s, and the prices of family homes have just skyrocketed. It’s going to become problematic for people. It has become problematic for the people.”

References

1965 births
Living people
University of California, Los Angeles alumni
California Institute of the Arts alumni
20th-century American photographers
21st-century American photographers
Photographers from California
Cerritos College
American artists of Mexican descent
Artists from Los Angeles
20th-century American women photographers
21st-century American women photographers